OBSS may refer to:

 Orbiter Boom Sensor System, a boom carried on board NASA's Space Shuttles
 Overlapping basic service set (also referred as Inter BSS Collision)
 Outward Bound School of Singapore
 Off Board Sensor Systems, in the List of acronyms: O

See also
 OBS (disambiguation)